Rex Hagon (born 13 December 1947) is a Canadian actor and television host.

His performing career began in his youth, most notably with the children's television program The Forest Rangers.

Born in Toronto, Ontario, Hagon attended Upper Canada College and is a sociology graduate of the University of Toronto who operates a consulting business which specializes in corporate communications.

Filmography
 1954-1958: On Camera (TV series, CBC)
 1956-1958: First Performance (TV series, CBC)
 1961: Jake and the Kid (TV series, CBC)
 1963-1965: The Forest Rangers (TV series, CBC)
 1969: Adventures in Rainbow Country
 1970-1974: Drop-In (TV series, CBC)
 1970s (specific years unknown): Polka Dot Door (TVOntario)
 1971: The Reincarnate
 1970s (specific years unknown): Tell Me a Story (TVOntario)
 1980: Matt and Jenny
 1979-1985: The Littlest Hobo (TV series, CTV)
 1981-1982: The Science Alliance (TV series, TVOntario)
 1985-1989: Alfred Hitchcock Presents (TV series, NBC)
 1987-1994: Street Legal (TV series, CBC)
 1988-1989: Police Academy (animated series) (TV series, Warner Bros. Television)
 1988-1989: RoboCop: The Animated Series (TV series, syndicated)
 1989-1991: Babar (TV series, HBO)
 1990: Piggsburg Pigs! (TV series, Fox Kids)
 1993-1995: The Busy World of Richard Scarry (TV series, Showtime/Nick Jr.)

See also
Garrick Hagon, brother

External links
 Rex Hagon Associates (current business)
 
 Cult TV: "Down to the woods we go, but no need to fear this 1960s classic" (refers to recent status of Forest Rangers actors such as Rex Hagon)

1947 births
Living people
Canadian male child actors
Canadian male voice actors
Male actors from Toronto
University of Toronto alumni